William Sharpe  was an English footballer. His regular position was as a forward. He played for Newton Heath from 1891 to 1892.

External links
MUFCInfo.com profile

English footballers
Manchester United F.C. players
Year of death missing
Year of birth missing
Football Alliance players
Association football forwards